This is a list of museums in Kenya. Many of these national and provincial museums are administered by the National Museums of Kenya (NMK).

Museums
 Abasuba Community Peace Museum, Mfangano Island.
 Aeumbu Community Peace Museum, near Embu.
 African Heritage Pan African Gallery, Nairobi.
 African Heritage House, Mlolongo Machakos county
 August 7th Memorial Park, Nairobi.
 Akamba Community Peace Museum, near Machakos.
 Bomas of Kenya
 Community Museums of Kenya
 Fort Jesus Museum, Mombasa
 Garissa Museum
 Gede National Monument
 Hyrax Hill Site Museum
 Jumba la Mtwana
 Kabarnet Museum
 Kapenguria Museum
 Karen Blixen Museum, near Nairobi
 Kariandusi Pre-Historic Site Museums
 Kenya National Archives, Nairobi.
 Kenyatta House
 Kisumu Museum
 Kitale Museum
 Koobi Fora Pre-Historic Site
 Krapf Memorial Museum
 Lamu Museum
 Lari Memorial Peace Museum, Kiambu District.
 Loiyangalani Desert Museum
 Malindi Museum
 Meru Museum
 Mnarani Ruins
 Nairobi Botanic Garden, Nairobi
 Nairobi Gallery, Nairobi.
 Nairobi National Museum, Nairobi
 Nairobi Railway Museum, Nairobi
 Nairobi Snake Park, Nairobi
 Narok Museum
Nyeri Museum
 Olorgesailie Pre-Historic Site, Olorgesailie.
 Porini Association
 Rabai Museum
 Seu-Seu Community Peace Museum.
 Siyu Fort
 Takwa Ruins
 Tambach Museum
 Thimlich Ohinga
 Treasures of Africa Museum
 Wajir Museum
Wray Memorial Museum

See also
 Sites and monuments in Kenya
 List of museums

References

External links

 Museums in Kenya

Kenya
Museums
Museums
Museums
Kenya